Potamothrissa is a genus of fish in the herring family, Clupeidae, which is native to Africa.  It currently contains three species.

Species
 Potamothrissa acutirostris (Boulenger, 1899) (Sharpnosed sawtooth pellonuline)
 Potamothrissa obtusirostris (Boulenger, 1909) (Bluntnosed sawtooth pellonuline)
 Potamothrissa whiteheadi Poll, 1974 (Whitehead's sawtooth pellonuline)

References
 

Clupeidae
Fish of Africa
Taxa named by Charles Tate Regan
Freshwater fish genera